Samuel Blakeslee (born June 25, 1955) is the founding Director of the Institute for Advanced Technology & Public Policy at California Polytechnic State University, San Luis Obispo. Blakeslee is a former Republican California State Senator representing California's 15th State Senate district which included the counties of Santa Clara, Monterey, San Luis Obispo, Santa Cruz and Santa Barbara. He previously served as a California State Assemblyman from California's 33rd State Assembly district, and a former State Assembly Republican Leader. He was elected to the California State Assembly in 2004 to represent the 33rd Assembly District, He was re-elected in 2006 and 2008, and elected to the California State Senate in 2010. Blakeslee retired from the Senate in December 2012.

Education
Blakeslee grew up on the Central Coast. He graduated from San Luis Obispo High School and then began a career in construction. Years later, he returned to school and attended Cuesta College, where his father, Earle Blakeslee, taught music when the college first opened in 1965. He later earned both bachelor's and master's degrees in geophysics from University of California, Berkeley. In 1989, Blakeslee earned a Ph.D. from University of California, Santa Barbara for his research in seismic scattering, micro-earthquake studies, and fault-zone attenuation. He is published in numerous scientific journals.

Senator and Assemblyman
Blakeslee was elected to the California State Assembly in 2004 and later to the State Senate. Elected by his fellow legislators, Blakeslee served a term as Assembly Minority Leader. In this role, he was a member of the "Big 5" with responsibility for negotiating the state budget and major policy initiatives. He also served and held leadership positions on a variety of legislative committees focusing on agriculture, energy, banking, environmental quality, education and other fields. He successfully authored dozens of bills to evolve and reform policy related to energy, the environment, health care, job creation, lobbying reform, public and worker safety, veterans' affairs and other areas of concern.

E3: Task Force on Energy, Environment and the Economy

While serving in Sacramento, Blakeslee founded and chaired the Task Force on Energy, the Environment and the Economy known as 'E3'. The group developed strategies to bridge the divide between the environment and the economy by applying emerging technologies. E3 worked to bridge the divide between the environment and the economy, demonstrating that reasonable and innovative strategies for growing our economy while remaining stewards of our environment exist. The E3 approach sought to advance the rapid development of emerging technologies and remove the barriers that prevent the creation of new markets. E3 emphasized that developing and offering cutting- edge technologies are a critical component to meeting environmental challenges. This work fueled Blakeslee's conviction that advanced technology can be an important tool in evolving public policy to better meet the needs of the modern world.

Since its creation in 2008, E3 members worked closely with industry leaders and the environmental community to craft legislative proposals across party lines and voted in support of key legislation that promoted cleantech, helped prevent oil spills, established incentives for reduced mobile source emissions, and promoted green chemistry.

The average E3 member scored 15 points higher on the California League of Conservation Voters (CLCV) scorecard than their non-E3 counterpart in the Assembly Republican caucus, and 18 points higher than their prior year score.

Committee Membership

 Vice Chair, Assembly Utilities and Commerce Committee
 Vice Chair, Assembly Rules Committee
 Member, Assembly Insurance Committee
 Member, Assembly Government Organization Committee
 Member, Assembly Budget Committee
 Member, Assembly Agriculture Committee
 Member, Assembly Public Employee Retirement and Social Security
 Chair, Senate Select Committee on Reform, Recovery and Realignment
 Vice Chair, Senate Banking Committee
 Member, Senate Judiciary Committee
 Member, Senate Environmental Quality Committee
 Member, Senate Education Committee
 Member, Senate Select Committee on Seismic Safety
 Member, Joint Select Committee on State Hospital Safety.

Awards and Recognitions

Blakeslee has been recognized for his bipartisan leadership skills by many different organizations over the years. He earned Legislator of the Year awards from the California Police Chiefs and the Faculty Association of California Community Colleges. He has been singled out for his dedication to the environment with a Climate Hero Award from the consumer group CALPIRG, a Public Service Award from the American Institute of Professional Geologists, the Rhodes Leadership Award from the League of Women Voters and recognition for support by the Partners for the Conservation of the Los Osos Coastal Dunes. He has also earned awards for advocacy from organizations representing seniors, the disabled, physicians, dentists and cattle ranchers.

Scientific work
Blakeslee worked as a research geophysicist at Exxon's research lab in Texas in the Long Range Research Division.  He received a patent for inventing an innovative technique that used medical cat-scan technology to create detailed images of geologic formations between wellbores. He later on moved into management and served as a strategic planner for the upstream research function at the lab.

Financial planner
Blakeslee serves as the President of two financial firms - Broker/Dealer Blakeslee & Blakeslee and the Registered Investment Advisor Blakeslee & Blakeslee Financial Advisers.  The multi-branch firms have offices in San Luis Obispo and Santa Barbara Counties managing over $750 million of assets. He is a Certified Financial Planner, General Municipal Securities Principal (Series 53), General Securities Principal (Series 24) and a General Securities Representative (Series 7).
 Home | Blakeslee & Blakeslee Financial Advisers

Institute for Advanced Technology and Public Policy (IATPP) 
Blakeslee founded IATPP in 2012 with a mission to "develop and promote practical solutions to real-world problems by informing and driving public policy through advanced technology". The institute has several research projects in the areas of digital democracy, algorithmic journalism and Anti-bot influence operations. The Digital Democracy project was a 2017 finalist for the "Innovations in American Government" award presented by the Ash Center for Democratic Governance and Innovation. The As of 2021, the institute organization page lists Christine Robinson as senior advisor and Foaad Khosmood as research director.

Community involvement
Prior to his election to the state Legislature, Blakeslee served as a two-term Trustee for Cuesta Community College. He was first elected in 1998.

In 1999, Assemblyman Blakeslee authored the successful DREAM Initiative. Passing by 75%, the DREAM Initiative was a countywide advisory ballot measure that sought to create a long-term vision for the future of PG&E's 12-mile scenic coastline known as the Diablo Canyon Lands.

In 2016 Sam Blakeslee, along with Charles Munger Jr, was co-author and co-proponent of Proposition 54, which was adopted by the electorate by an almost 2:1 margin.  The Constitutional Amendment created a 72-hour in-print rule for all state legislation prior to adoption along with other transparency requirements. California Proposition 54, Public Display of Legislative Bills Prior to Vote (2016)

In 2017 Sam Blakeslee became a board member of California Common Cause.  He became Vice Chair of the board in 2020. State Advisory Board

In 2018 Sam Blakeslee became the Founding President of the San Luis Coastal Education Foundation, a non-profit working to increase funding for innovation in education at the San Luis Coastal Unified School district.  Over the next five years the Foundation will be the recipient of $10M in funding from SB1090, which utilizes rate-payer funds to mitigate the closure of the Diablo Canyon Nuclear Power Plant. About Us

In August 2021, in response "to rising concerns about San Luis Obispo County’s unhoused population,"  Sam Blakeslee and attorney Greg Gillet launched San Luis Obispo County Citizens Commission on Homelessness. The commission's goal is to recommend solutions seeking "accountability and results". On December 2, 2021, the Blakeslee and Gillet delivered a first set of recommendations, including a proposal for a new Joint Powers Authority to coordinate the regional response to homelessness.

References

External links
IATPP web site

Join California Sam Blakeslee

1955 births
Living people
American financial businesspeople
American geophysicists
Republican Party California state senators
ExxonMobil people
Republican Party members of the California State Assembly
People from San Luis Obispo, California
School board members in California
Scientists from California
UC Berkeley College of Letters and Science alumni
University of California, Santa Barbara alumni
Cuesta College alumni
21st-century American politicians